Lipiny Górne-Lewki  is a village in the administrative district of Gmina Potok Górny, within Biłgoraj County, Lublin Voivodeship, in eastern Poland.

The village has a population of 358.

References

Villages in Biłgoraj County